Murex brevispina, also known as the Short-spined murex, is a species of large predatory sea snail, a marine gastropod mollusk in the family Muricidae, the rock snails or murex snails.

Subspecies
 Murex brevispina brevispina Lamarck, 1822
 Murex brevispina macgillivrayi Dohrn, 1862
 Murex brevispina ornamentalis Ponder & E. H. Vokes, 1988
 Murex brevispina senilis Jousseaume, 1874
 Murex brevispina toliaraensis Bozzetti, 2020
 Murex brevispina albus Bozzetti, 2020: synonym of Murex brevispina toliaraensis Bozzetti, 2020 (invalid: junior homonym of Murex craticulatus var. albus Scacchi, 1836; M. brevispina toliaraensis is a replacement name)

References

 Steyn, D.G & Lussi, M. (2005). Offshore Shells of Southern Africa: A pictorial guide to more than 750 Gastropods. Published by the authors. Pp. i–vi, 1–289
 Houart, R.; Kilburn, R. N. & Marais, A. P. (2010). Muricidae. pp. 176–270, in: Marais A.P. & Seccombe A.D. (eds), Identification guide to the seashells of South Africa. Volume 1. Groenkloof: Centre for Molluscan Studies. 376 pp

External links
 Lamarck, [J.-B. M.] de. (1822). Histoire naturelle des animaux sans vertèbres. Tome septième. Paris: published by the Author, 711 pp

Gastropods described in 1822
Murex